The Palazzo Branconio dell'Aquila is a lost palace in the rione  Borgo of Rome (west of Castel Sant'Angelo), designed by Raphael for Giovanbattista Branconio dell'Aquila, a papal advisor and goldsmith.

It was designed by the Italian artist in his last years of life, around 1520. The palace lay along the Borgo Nuovo road, and was demolished around 1660 together with the adjoining block, named "Isola del Priorato" after the nearby Priory of the Knights of Rhodes, to open a square in front of Saint Peter's Square colonnade, the Piazza Rusticucci.

See also
Palazzo Jacopo da Brescia

Sources

External links
https://web.archive.org/web/20080706120332/http://rome.jc-r.net/palazzo-branconio-dell-aquila.htm

Buildings and structures completed in 1511
Houses completed in the 16th century
Branconio dell'Aquila
Raphael buildings
Renaissance architecture in Rome
Buildings and structures demolished in the 17th century
Branconio dell'Aquila
1511 establishments in the Papal States